Radivoje Krivokapić (born 11 September 1953) is a Serbian former handball player who competed for Yugoslavia in the 1976 Summer Olympics.

Club career
After starting out at Senta, Krivokapić played for Partizan in the 1972–73 season, as the club suffered relegation from the top flight. He would later move to Slovan, helping them win the championship title in 1980 and reach the European Cup final in 1981. Later on, Krivokapić left Yugoslavia and went to Germany in 1982, spending one season with SG Dietzenbach. He subsequently moved to Spain and played for Tecnisa Alicante from 1983 to 1985. Krivokapić also played for the club in the 1986–87 season.

International career
At international level, Krivokapić represented Yugoslavia at the 1976 Summer Olympics. He also participated in two World Championships, winning the silver medal in 1982.

Personal life
Krivokapić is the uncle of fellow handball players Marko Krivokapić and Milorad Krivokapić.

Honours
Slovan
 Yugoslav Handball Championship: 1979–80

References

External links
 Olympic record
 

1953 births
Living people
People from Senta
Serbian male handball players
Yugoslav male handball players
Olympic handball players of Yugoslavia
Handball players at the 1976 Summer Olympics
Competitors at the 1979 Mediterranean Games
Mediterranean Games gold medalists for Yugoslavia
Mediterranean Games medalists in handball
RK Partizan players
Handball-Bundesliga players
Liga ASOBAL players
Expatriate handball players
Yugoslav expatriate sportspeople in Germany
Yugoslav expatriate sportspeople in Spain